"Here We Go Round the Mulberry Bush" is a single by Traffic. It is the title song to the film of the same name, and features all four members of Traffic singing a joint lead, though the bridge and parts of the chorus have Steve Winwood singing unaccompanied. The single uses an edited version of the song, with the intro removed. When released in late 1967, the single cracked the UK Top 10. Footage of the band acting out the song was commissioned by The Beatles for possible inclusion in the film Magical Mystery Tour but was not used in the final edit. It is now included in the special features of the 2012 DVD/Blu-ray edition of the film.

References

1967 singles
Traffic (band) songs
Songs written for films
Songs written by Steve Winwood
Songs written by Jim Capaldi
Song recordings produced by Jimmy Miller
1967 songs
Songs written by Dave Mason
Island Records singles